Seth Grahame-Smith (born Seth Jared Greenberg; January 4, 1976) is an American writer and film producer, best known as the author of The New York Times best-selling novels Pride and Prejudice and Zombies and Abraham Lincoln, Vampire Hunter, both of which have been adapted as feature films. Grahame-Smith is also the co-creator, head writer and executive producer of The Hard Times of RJ Berger, a scripted television comedy appearing on MTV. In collaboration with David Katzenberg, his partner in Katzsmith Productions, Grahame-Smith is currently developing a number of projects for television and film.

Personal life

Grahame-Smith was born in Rockville Centre, New York, the son of Deborah Ann (née Williams) and Barry Michael Greenberg. He eventually grew up in Weston and Bethel, Connecticut, where he attended Bethel High School. His parents divorced when he was a child. Subsequently, his mother changed his surname to "Grahame", after author Kenneth Grahame, and later added the surname "Smith", from her remarriage. Grahame-Smith attended an Episcopal church after his mother's remarriage (his father was Jewish). His mother was a literary editor and his stepfather was a rare books dealer.

Grahame-Smith received a degree in film from Emerson College. He currently lives in Los Angeles with his wife, Erin, and sons, Joshua and Jacob.

Career

Literature
Grahame-Smith's first widely published book was The Big Book of Porn: A Penetrating Look at the World of Dirty Movies, a non-fiction history of the erotic art form published in 2005. The next year, Grahame-Smith published The Spider-Man Handbook: The Ultimate Training Manual, an examination of Marvel Comics' Spider-Man, with an introduction by Stan Lee. In 2007, Grahame-Smith wrote How to Survive a Horror Movie: All the Skills to Dodge the Kills, a tongue-in-cheek guide to help readers escape situations most often shown in horror films. The book's introduction was written by horror film director Wes Craven. Grahame-Smith's next book was the satirical Pardon My President: Fold-and-Mail Apologies for 8 Years, a collection of letters addressed to various parties intended to apologize for the wrongs they had suffered under the administration of George W. Bush.

The idea for Grahame-Smith's next novel, Pride and Prejudice and Zombies, came from his editor at Quirk Books, Jason Rekulak. Using Jane Austen's classic novel Pride and Prejudice as a platform, Rekulak suggested that Grahame-Smith mix a zombie plot into the public domain novel. Enamored of the idea, Grahame-Smith immediately began working on the novel, first by reading Pride and Prejudice and then by inserting the gruesome zombie elements, a process he has described as similar to microsurgery. Though Quirk Books was initially reluctant to publish the book in fear of alienating Austen's fans, the novel went to press in 2009, with modest sales expectations. In the weeks prior to the release, however, the book's popularity swelled dramatically as the cover and title of the novel circulated the internet. Anticipation for the book grew so rapidly that in its first week of release, Pride and Prejudice and Zombies surged to No. 3 on the New York Times Best Seller list. Since that time, the novel has sold over a million copies and been translated into over 20 languages.

Building on the success of Pride and Prejudice and Zombies, Grahame-Smith wrote another mash-up, Abraham Lincoln, Vampire Hunter. As the title suggests, this book traces Abraham Lincoln's life from childhood through assassination, relying upon his "secret diaries" to reveal his central role in a worldwide struggle against vampirism. Released on March 2, 2010, this novel debuted at No. 4 on The New York Times best seller list under the category "Hardcover Fiction."

In addition to writing novels, Grahame-Smith made his debut as a comic book writer on Marvel Zombies Return: Hulk with artist Richard Elson.

Unholy Night, Grahame-Smith's most recent novel, was released on April 10, 2012. It depicts Balthazar, Gaspar, and Melchyor, the Magi of popular tradition, as criminals who ultimately visit the infant Jesus. Herod the Great, Augustus Caesar, Pontius Pilate, and the Virgin Mary appear as supporting characters.

Film
Two of Grahame-Smith's best-selling books were made into feature films. Grahame-Smith adapted his book, Abraham Lincoln: Vampire Hunter, for the screen, for producers Tim Burton and Timur Bekmambetov. In 2011, Pride and Prejudice and Zombies was optioned by Lionsgate Entertainment, with Natalie Portman producing, and David O. Russell initially set to adapt and direct. Russell later left the project. In 2013, a new group of producers, including Portman, hired Burr Steers to direct. Lily James and Bella Heathcote were chosen to star as the oldest Bennett sisters. Pride and Prejudice and Zombies was released on February 5, 2016.

Grahame-Smith wrote the script for Tim Burton's Dark Shadows, the film adaptation of the 1960s soap opera, replacing longtime Burton scribe John August. Grahame-Smith produced the film adaptation of the Mark Bianculli and Jeff Richard spec script The Waiting. Smith polished the script for Fantastic Four. In 2013, Smith was tapped to write and produce a third Gremlins film. In January 2015, it was announced that he will write the screenplay for a sequel to Beetlejuice, and that the Gremlins project was put on hold. The remake Something Wicked This Way Comes is set for his directorial debut. Smith produced the theatrical film versions of Stephen King's It: It, which was released in September 2017, and It Chapter Two, released two years later, and is producing the feature length follow up to the 1980s' action-comedy homage film short titled Kung Fury in 2018.

Television
After receiving a degree in film from Emerson College, Grahame-Smith moved to Los Angeles, where he wrote and produced for several television series, including Vendettas and the History Channel's History's Mysteries. Building on these experiences, Grahame-Smith was hired to produce an innovative CBS online series, Clark and Michael, starring Clark Duke, Michael Cera, David Cross, Patton Oswalt, and Andy Richter.

While working on Clark and Michael, Grahame-Smith met another producer on the series, David Katzenberg (son of Jeffrey), who would become his partner in KatzSmith Productions. Under the KatzSmith banner, Grahame-Smith and Katzenberg created, wrote, and produced a scripted comedy for MTV called The Hard Times of RJ Berger, which follows an awkward high-school loser who gains notoriety for his extraordinary endowment.

In October 2020, it was announced that Grahame-Smith would be serving as showrunner for an upcoming HBO Max series based on Green Lantern. He is also set to write the series alongside Marc Guggenheim. In October of 2022 it was announced that the show would take a new direction and that he had opted not to stay with the new project.

Bibliography
 Big Book of Porn: A Penetrating Look at the World of Dirty Movies (2005)
 The Spider-Man Handbook: The Ultimate Training Manual (2006)
 How to Survive a Horror Movie: All the Skills to Dodge the Kills (2007)
 Pardon My President: Fold-and-Mail Apologies for 8 Years (2008)
 Pride and Prejudice and Zombies (2009)
 Abraham Lincoln, Vampire Hunter (2010)
 Unholy Night (2012)
 The Last American Vampire (2015)

Filmography

Film

Television

References

External links
 
 

 
1976 births
American comics writers
21st-century American novelists
American humorists
American male screenwriters
American film producers
Television producers from New York (state)
Living people
Emerson College alumni
People from Rockville Centre, New York
Mass media people from New York (state)
American male novelists
People from Weston, Connecticut
People from Bethel, Connecticut
21st-century American male writers
Screenwriters from New York (state)
Showrunners
Bethel High School (Connecticut) alumni
Television producers from Connecticut